The 2013–2014 Chinese Short Track Speed Skating League was a multi race national tournament over a season for Short track speed skating. The season began on 10 October 2013 and ended on 9 March 2014. The World Cup is organized by the Chinese Skating Association.

Calendar & Results

Men

1. Harbin, October 10 to 13, 2013

2. Harbin, October 17 to 20, 2013

3. Changchun, November 14 to 17, 2013

Olympic Selection: Qingdao, November 22 to 24, 2013

4. Changchun, December 12 to 15, 2013 (Juniors, boys & girls)

5. Changchun, December 19 to 22, 2013 (Juniors, boys & girls)

6. Olympic Warm-up: Shanghai, January 10 to 12, 2014

National Junior Championships: Changchun, January 17 to 19, 2013

National Championships: Changchun, March 14 to 16, 2013

Women

1. Harbin, October 10 to 13, 2013

2. Harbin, October 17 to 20, 2013

3. Changchun, November 14 to 17, 2013

Olympic Selection: Qingdao, November 22 to 24, 2013

4. Changchun, December 12 to 15, 2013 (Juniors, boys & girls)

5. Changchun, December 19 to 22, 2013 (Juniors, boys & girls)

6. Olympic Warm-up: Shanghai, January 10 to 12, 2014

National Junior Championships: Changchun, January 17 to 19, 2013

National Championships: Changchun, March 14 to 16, 2013

References

Short track speed skating competitions
Speed skating in China
2013 in Chinese sport
2014 in Chinese sport
2013 in short track speed skating
2014 in short track speed skating